Kevin Aluthgama Farias (born 21 March 1990) is a Brazilian futsal player who plays as a winger for Sorocaba and the Brazilian national futsal team.

References

External links
Liga Nacional de Futsal profile

1990 births
Living people
Brazilian men's futsal players
Sportspeople from Porto Alegre